Thomas Greenall (5 May 1857 – 22 December 1937), also known as Tom Greenall,  was a British Labour Party politician.  He was the Member of Parliament (MP) for Farnworth in Lancashire from 1922 to 1929.

Born at Tarbock in Lancashire, Greenall began working at the age of nine.  He followed his father in working as a coal miner for twenty years, then became a full-time agent for the Lancashire and Cheshire Miners' Federation (LCMF).

In 1906, Greenall became president of the LCMF, and he served on the executive of the Miners' Federation of Great Britain, and as vice-president of the Lancashire, Cheshire and North Staffordshire Miners' Wages Board.

Greenall stood unsuccessfully for Labour in Leigh at the  January 1910 United Kingdom general election, and then in Farnworth at the 1918 United Kingdom general election.  He won the seat in 1922, serving until 1929, when he retired.

References

External links 

Labour Party (UK) MPs for English constituencies
Members of the Parliamentary Committee of the Trades Union Congress
Miners' Federation of Great Britain-sponsored MPs
Trade unionists from Lancashire
People from the Metropolitan Borough of Knowsley
1857 births
1937 deaths
UK MPs 1922–1923
UK MPs 1923–1924
UK MPs 1924–1929